Edessa (also known as the "City of Waters and of the 5 Senses"), until 1923 Vodena, is a city in northern Greece and the capital of the Pella regional unit, in the Central Macedonia region of Greece. It was also the capital of the defunct province of the same name.

Edessa holds a special place in the history of the Greek world as, according to some ancient sources, it was here that Caranus established the first capital of ancient Macedon. Later, under the Byzantine Empire, Edessa benefited from its strategic location, controlling the Via Egnatia as it enters the Pindus mountains, and became a center of medieval Greek culture, famed for its strong walls and fortifications. In the modern period, Edessa was one of Greece's industrial centers until the middle of the 20th century, with many textile factories operating in the city and its immediate vicinity. Today however its economy mainly relies on services and tourism. Edessa hosts most of the administrative services of the Pella regional unit, as well as some departments of the Thessaloniki-based University of Macedonia.

Name
The Greek name  (Édessa) means "tower in the water" and is generally thought to be of Phrygian origin, although a minority of scholars consider it to be Illyrian instead. The Slavic name Vodĭnŭ commonly held to derive from the Slavic word for "water" was first attested in the 10th century, and became the common name until the 20th century.

Vodená was the name used in Greek until 1923, when the ancient name was revived. The Bulgarian and Macedonian name remains Voden. In Turkish, the city is known as Vodina, and in Aromanian the city is known as either Edessa, Vudena or Vodina.

Seleucus I Nicator named the city of Edessa in Mesopotamia (modern Şanlıurfa, Turkey) after the Macedonian Edessa.

Municipality
The municipality Edessa was formed at the 2011 local government reform by the merger of the following 2 former municipalities, that became municipal units:
Edessa
Vegoritida

The municipality has an area of 611.212 km2, the municipal unit 321.225 km2.

History

According to some ancient writers, Caranus, the legendary founder of the Argead Dynasty (whose most famous member was Alexander the Great), established the city of Edessa and made it the first capital of ancient Macedon, and later Argead rulers moved Macedon's capital to Aegae and eventually Pella. Archaeological remains have been discovered on the site of ancient Edessa, just below the modern city (40°47'48.48"N 22° 3'26.24"E). The walls and many buildings have been unearthed so far. A colonnade with inscription in Greek dates from Roman times. The city achieved certain prominence in the first centuries AD, being located on the Via Egnatia. From 27 BC to 268 AD it had its own mint. The Orthodox Christian Saint Vassa and her three children were put to death here in the 3rd century AD. 

Little is known about the fate of the city after 500 AD, but we know that its Greek bishop, Isidoros, participated in the Ecumenical Council of 692.

The city disappears from the sources thereafter, and re-emerges only in the 11th century, in the account of the Bulgarian wars of Emperor Basil II by the chronicler John Skylitzes, with the Slavic name Vodena ( in Greek). The Bulgarian historian Vasil Zlatarski hypothesized that it was Vodena, and not Vidin on the Danube, that was a base of the Cometopuli in their revolt against Byzantium.

Due to its strategic location, controlling the Via Egnatia as it enters the Pindus mountains, the town was much fought over in the subsequent centuries: the Normans under Bohemond I captured it briefly in 1083, but were eventually repelled by the forces of Emperor Alexios I Komnenos. The Nicaean emperor John III Vatatzes captured in 1253, while in the mid-14th century its possession was disputed between the Byzantines and the Serbs under Stephen Dushan, with the latter securing its possession in January 1351. The city was for some time under control of Radoslav Hlapen, who gave it as dowry to his son-in-law Nikola Bagaš probably around 1366/7. The city remained in Bagaš's hands at least until 1385. It was conquered by the Ottoman commander Evrenos Bey in the late 14th century, along with the rest of Macedonia. In 1519 (Hijri 925) the town of Vodine was inhabited by Muslims and Christians. It had 68 Muslim and 116 Christian households and it was a joint-zeamet of Murad of İpek and Hüseyin son of Dizdar.

During the period of Ottoman rule, the Turkish and Muslim component of the town's population steadily increased. From the 1860s onwards, the town was a flashpoint for clashes between Greeks and Bulgarians.

After almost 500 years of Ottoman rule, Edessa was annexed by Greece on 18 October 1912 during the First Balkan War, following the Hellenic Army's military victory against the Ottomans in the battle of Sarantaporo. At that time, Edessa was already well on its way to becoming a major industrial center in Macedonia. Four large textile factories with the Hemp Factory being the biggest, employing the abundant waterfalls as a source of energy. Prior to World War I, in addition to Greeks, the region of Edessa was also populated by Turks, Bulgarians, Pomaks and Vlachs, but during the population exchange between Greece and Turkey most of the Turks and Pomaks living in Edessa were transferred to Turkey. Large numbers of Greek refugees from Asia Minor were settled in the area in 1923. The population swelled from 9,441 to 13,115 in the 1920s. A large segment of the population specialized in silk production, allowing Edessa to enjoy a high standard of living in the interwar period (1922–1940).

The town suffered during the last days of German occupation of Greece in 1944. As a retaliation for the shooting of one soldier by resistance fighters, the Nazis set Edessa on fire. Half of the city, including the Cathedral and the First Primary School, was destroyed and thousands of people were left homeless.

During the Greek Civil War (1946-1949) Edessa was twice attacked in 1948 by the Democratic Army of Greece (DSE), under the control of the Communist Party of Greece. The Slavic-Macedonian National Liberation Front (SNOF), later simply the National Liberation Front (NOF) was heavily established in the area, with eleven Slav Macedonian partisan units operating in the mountains around the city. When the NOF merged with the Democratic Army of Greece (DSE), many Slav Macedonians in the region enlisted as volunteers in the DSE. In early 1949, the military forces of the Greek Government conducted a series of successful military operations that destroyed all communist forces and after the end of war in August 1949, many communists and sympathizers, both ethnic Greeks and Slav Macedonians were expelled from Greece and fled to the countries of Eastern Europe.

Since the 1970s Edessa's economy no longer relies on industry. At the beginning of the 21st century, it is a city based on services (mostly linked to its function as capital of the Pella regional unit) and tourism due to the many ancient sights nearby, including ancient Pella, the waterfalls and winter sports.

The ancient site (Loggos)

Demographics

Infrastructure

Transportation

Edessa railway station is located on the Thessaloniki–Bitola railway and is served by both InterCity trains and Proastiakos Thessaloniki suburban trains.

Media
Pella TV
Egnatia TV

Sports
Edessa hosts two sport clubs with presence or earlier presence in the higher national divisions in Greek football and handball. These clubs are shown below.

Notable people
Minas Minoidis (18th century), scholar, figure of the Modern Greek Enlightenment
Solon Grigoriadis (1912-1994), army officer and journalist
Dimitris Beis (1928 - 2012) resistance figure against the junta of the Colonels and Mayor of Athens, 1979 - 1986
Giorgos Paschalidis, (born 1951) former Minister and close associate of Prime Minister Costas Simitis 
Aggelis Gatsos (1771–1839), fighter in the Greek War of Independence
Vangel Ajanovski-Oče (1909–1996), Ethnic Macedonian secretary of SNOF
Hakkı Yeten (1910-1989), famous Turkish Football Player of Beşiktaş J.K.
Hadži-Neimar (1792-1870), architect and chief builder of the autonomous Principality of Serbia
Markos Meskos, writer, poet
Marietta Chrousala (born 1983 ), fashion model and television presenter

Twin cities
 Gornji Milanovac, Serbia
 Pleven, Bulgaria
 Bitola, North Macedonia

Gallery

See also
List of settlements in the Pella regional unit
Edessa Ecclesiastical Museum
Folklore Museum of Edessa

References

Further reading
F. Papazoglou, Les villes de Macédoine romaine (The Cities of Roman Macedonia), BCH Suppl. 16, 1988, 127–131.
Walter Bauer, Orthodoxy and Heresy in Earliest Christianity, 1934, (in English 1971) (On-line text)

External links
Edessa official site
Infosite about Edessa
Pella regional unit official site, containing useful information about Edessa
Hellenic Ministry of Culture: Old Cathedral of Edessa

 
Greek prefectural capitals
Bottiaea
Municipalities of Central Macedonia
Archaeological sites in Macedonia (Greece)
Populated places in ancient Macedonia
Populated places in Pella (regional unit)